Sans Souci (French for "no worries" or "carefree") is a census-designated place (CDP) in Greenville County, South Carolina, United States. The population was 7,869 at the 2010 census. It is part of the Greenville-Anderson-Mauldin, SC Metropolitan Statistical Area.

Geography
Sans Souci is located in central Greenville County at  (34.887450, -82.418889). Sans Souci is bordered to the west by Berea and to the southwest by Parker, both unincorporated communities.

U.S. Route 276 (Poinsett Highway) forms the eastern border of Sans Souci; the highway leads south into Greenville and north  to Travelers Rest.

Demographics

2020 census

As of the 2020 United States census, there were 8,581 people, 3,624 households, and 2,033 families residing in the CDP.

2000 census
As of the census of 2000, there were 7,836 people, 3,370 households, and 2,082 families residing in the CDP. The population density was 2,325.5 people per square mile (897.8/km2). There were 3,705 housing units at an average density of 1,099.5/sq mi (424.5/km2). The racial makeup of the CDP was 80.58% White, 12.63% African American, 0.43% Native American, 1.21% Asian, 0.13% Pacific Islander, 3.33% from other races, and 1.68% from two or more races. Hispanic or Latino of any race were 7.64% of the population.

There were 3,370 households, out of which 26.9% had children under the age of 18 living with them, 42.2% were married couples living together, 14.6% had a female householder with no husband present, and 38.2% were non-families. 31.6% of all households were made up of individuals, and 11.6% had someone living alone who was 65 years of age or older. The average household size was 2.32 and the average family size was 2.89.

In the CDP, the population was spread out, with 22.5% under the age of 18, 10.9% from 18 to 24, 31.2% from 25 to 44, 20.2% from 45 to 64, and 15.3% who were 65 years of age or older. The median age was 35 years. For every 100 females, there were 93.9 males. For every 100 females age 18 and over, there were 90.7 males.

The median income for a household in the CDP was $27,749, and the median income for a family was $32,654. Males had a median income of $26,720 versus $21,010 for females. The per capita income for the CDP was $14,143. About 10.7% of families and 15.7% of the population were below the poverty line, including 18.1% of those under age 18 and 12.8% of those age 65 or over.

References

External links 
 Sans Souci Neighborhood Alliance

Census-designated places in Greenville County, South Carolina
Census-designated places in South Carolina
Upstate South Carolina